The Federal Polytechnic, Ukana is a federal government higher education institution located in Ukana, Akwa Ibom State, Nigeria. The current rector is Uduak Sunday Ukekpe.

History 
The Federal Polytechnic, Ukana was established in 2014.

Courses 
The institution offers the following courses;

 Computer Science
 Science Laboratory Technology
 Accountancy
 Statistics
 Mechanical Engineering Technology
 Business Administration and Management
 Computer Engineering
 Electrical/Electronic Engineering

References 

Federal polytechnics in Nigeria
2014 establishments in Nigeria